Ridgeview Classical Schools, or Ridgeview, is a free public K-12 charter school located at 1800 South Lemay,  Fort Collins, Colorado, Larimer County, United States. Ridgeview is chartered through the Poudre School District and serves approximately 750 students, as of 2019. The school is accountable to its charter, the local school district, and the state of Colorado.

Elementary and middle schools
Grades K-8 follow a curriculum that was originally inspired by the Core Knowledge Sequence. Since Ridgeview's inception in 2001, it has enriched this curriculum substantially. Elementary students begin studying Latin in kindergarten and continue it through eighth grade. Additionally, they begin studying Greek in third grade. Ridgeview also begins teaching students cursive penmanship in third grade in a program that was developed by Michael Sull and Marie Hornback. All elementary students also study art, music, and martial arts. Students in the elementary use the Riggs phonics system to learn to read and become proficient in diagramming sentences to improve their understanding of English grammar. Ridgeview's math program is heavily influenced by the Singapore Math program, though elements of Saxon Math have also been incorporated. Students are ability-grouped at all grades in order to work at the highest level at which they can be successful across the curriculum. Character education is integrated throughout the curriculum.

High school
Grades 9-12 continue with a classical, liberal arts curriculum. Ridgeview's high school courses make strong use of primary sources, and where possible, Socratic discussion in classes. Students working towards a diploma take an equal number of courses in the humanities and natural sciences. This means four years of history, science, literature, and mathematics. Additionally, students are required to take courses in government, economics, and moral philosophy. Students are required to have a proficiency in Latin in order to graduate, and they also complete a 7,000-word senior thesis and complete a three-hour, written leaving exam. Students present the senior thesis to their peers and the faculty and are required to defend it. Most students also elect to take courses in music and art. Additionally, a variety of electives are offered, including not only AP courses, but concurrent enrollment courses through the University of Colorado (CU). A broad assortment of other electives are available to students ranging from neuroscience, robotics, computer programming, Russian literature, Dante, psychology of religion, along with many others. Modern language electives include: Spanish, French, and German. All modern languages are taught by native speakers.

Achievements and recognitions
U.S. News & World Report ranked United States high schools and awarded Ridgeview Classical Schools a gold medal. It is ranked 26th out of 458 high schools in Colorado, and is ranked 28th among the nation's charter schools and 103rd among high schools nationally.

Ridgeview's K-9 chess team won Colorado State Championship in 2010 and 2011. In 2012 Ridgeview's K-9 chess team took fifth place nationwide. The high school chess team took third place in the state in 2012, and first place in 2013, 2014, and 2015. In 2013, the K-3 and K-6 chess teams both took second place in Colorado.

References

Public high schools in Colorado
Charter schools in Colorado
Education in Fort Collins, Colorado
Schools in Larimer County, Colorado